The 1921 U.S. Open was the 25th U.S. Open, held July 21–22 at Columbia Country Club in Chevy Chase, Maryland, a suburb northwest of Washington, D.C. Jim Barnes won his only U.S. Open, nine strokes ahead of runners-up Walter Hagen and Fred McLeod, both former champions. It was the third of Barnes' four major championships.

Barnes shot an opening round 69 on Thursday morning and led wire-to-wire; he led McLeod by four after the second round, and by seven through 54 holes. President Warren G. Harding was in attendance for the final round on Friday afternoon and presented the championship cup and medal to Barnes. Barnes' play was described by Evening Star sports reporter Walter R. McCallum as "a remarkable brand of golf by playing with the most implicit confidence and coolness".

Chick Evans, the 1916 champion, edged 19-year-old Bobby Jones by a single stroke for low amateur, finishing alone in fourth place.  Two-time champion Alex Smith  played in his last major and finished in a tie for fifth place.

Past champions in the field 

Source:

Round summaries

First round
Thursday, July 21, 1921 (morning)

Source:

Second round
Thursday, July 21, 1921 (afternoon)

Source:

Third round
Friday, July 22, 1921 (morning)

Source:

Final round
Friday, July 22, 1921 (afternoon)

Source:
(a) denotes amateur

References

External links

USGA Championship Database
USOpen.com - 1921

U.S. Open (golf)
Golf in Maryland
Chevy Chase (CDP), Maryland
U.S. Open
U.S. Open
U.S. Open
U.S. Open